The Gathering is the eighth studio album by American thrash metal band Testament, released on June 8, 1999. It was the first release the band had done with Spitfire Records. Co-produced by band members, Chuck Billy and Eric Peterson, this was the first album featuring new musicians Steve DiGiorgio on bass guitar and Dave Lombardo on drums. Billy, Peterson and Lombardo, along with longtime Testament collaborator Del James, are also given composer credits on the album. It would also be the only Testament album for 23 years to feature Lombardo, who left the band right before the tour for The Gathering started and he would rejoin in 2022.

The Gathering continued Testament's transition into death metal which began on their previous album Demonic, but it also brought back their thrash-oriented sound. As a result, this album has been seen as a return-to-form for the band.

Overview
The Gathering featured eleven tracks when it was released, drawing critic and fan acclaim for such songs as "D.N.R. (Do Not Resuscitate)", "Riding the Snake", and "Legions of the Dead". After release Testament embarked on the Riding the Snake World Tour to promote the album with "touring" lead guitarist Steve Smyth (ex-Vicious Rumors) and Sadus drummer Jon Allen. The tour ended in 2001 shortly before frontman Chuck Billy was diagnosed with cancer. As a result, Testament would not release another studio album until 2008 with The Formation of Damnation, although they did release an album of re-recorded material, First Strike Still Deadly, in 2001.

The Gathering is the first of five albums to date featuring engineering and mixing work done with artist and former Sabbat guitarist Andy Sneap. It is also the first of five reissues that Testament has done with Prosthetic Records. The album was reissued January 8, 2008, with an instrumental bonus track, "Hammer of the Gods," increasing the new track total to twelve. While "Hammer of the Gods" is listed on the track listing of the original American release, it does not actually appear on the CD. However, it does appear on the worldwide Prosthetic Records 2008 reissue.

Album cover artwork for The Gathering was done by Dave McKean who also did the cover art for the two prior Testament studio albums Demonic and Low.

At the time of release, Testament had not done a music video since 1994's Low and was looking at possibly using live footage as a music video to promote The Gathering. Demonic, the band's previous 1997 release, had been handled by a distribution company that went bankrupt to the tune of $44 million which had stranded most retail supply in locked warehouses and off the shelves, seriously hurting the album release.

Musical style
In a 2010 interview, vocalist Chuck Billy described how the free flow of ideas between Dave Lombardo and Eric Peterson was the "key and secret" to the album's overall heavier sound in comparison to previous albums.

Billy's aggressive vocal approaches and darker death metal sound were apparent on the previous album, Demonic, and continued to be on The Gathering, but it was the range and diversity that he achieved on this album that drew the highest acclaim.

While the album's songs range from heavier death metal to a more melodic thrash metal, it was Billy's ability to go from his distinct sound to a death metal growl while blending the two that has been noted as a trademark of Testament.

Reception

The Gathering reached #48 on the German album charts, its only chart showing, possibly reflecting problems from the prior albums and a lack of coverage rather than weaknesses with the album.

In 2021, it was named one of the 20 best metal albums of 1999 by Metal Hammer magazine.

Track listing
"Hammer of the Gods" did not appear on the domestic American re-release, though the song title was listed on the album cover. It is an instrumental bonus track originally only available on the Japan reissue; however, it was eventually added to the  Prosthetic Records worldwide 2008 re-release.

Personnel
Testament
Chuck Billy – vocals
James Murphy – lead guitar
Eric Peterson – lead and rhythm guitar
Steve Di Giorgio – bass
Dave Lombardo – drums

Production
Chuck Billy – co-producer
Eric Peterson – co-producer, engineering
Andy Sneap – engineering, mixing
James Murphy – engineering
Phil Arnold  – executive Producer (2008)
Vincent Wojno  – engineering (2008)
Kent Matcke  – engineering (2008)
Dave McKean  – album cover artwork

Charts

References

External links
Testament official website
Steve Smyth website
Spitfire Records T section
Prosthetic Records releases

Testament (band) albums
1999 albums
Albums with cover art by Dave McKean
Spitfire Records albums
Prosthetic Records albums
Death metal albums by American artists